Colle di Brianza is a mountain of Lombardy, Italy, It has an elevation of 877 metres.

Lugano Prealps
Mountains of the Alps
Mountains of Lombardy